The Men's African Qualifiers for the 1960 Summer Olympics tournament began in November 1959 and ended in April 1960.

Round 1

Group 1

Group 2

Group 3

Round 2 

United Arab Republic and Tunisia qualify.

References 

Football qualification for the 1960 Summer Olympics
Football at the Summer Olympics – Men's African Qualifiers